Karmana (Uzbek Cyrillic & ) is an urban-type settlement and seat of Karmana District in Navoiy Region in Uzbekistan. The town population in 1989 was 16,767 people.

References

Populated places in Navoiy Region
Urban-type settlements in Uzbekistan